Sitara Achakzai (also transliterated Achaksai) (born 1956/1957 – died 12 April 2009) was a leading Afghan women's rights activist and a member of the regional parliament in Kandahar. She was assassinated by the Taliban.

"Achakzai" is a name shared by one of the sub-tribes of Durrani clan, part of the Pashtun people, one of the largest
ethnic groups of Afghanistan. She held dual citizenship between Afghanistan and Germany, and was well known in Canada as some of her extended family live in the Toronto area.

Death 
Like Malalai Kakar and Safia Amajan, Sitara Achakzai was targeted by the Taliban because she was trying to improve the situation of Afghan women. At the age of 52, she was assassinated by Taliban gunmen in Kandahar on 12 April 2009.

The Canadian government condemned the assassination. Michaëlle Jean, the Governor General, said

Encomium
 "She was a warrior, she was a brave woman and she always fought for women's rights and the poor's rights; that's why they didn't like her ... [I]t's a loss for everybody; for democracy, basically, because she fought for everybody." (Ajmal Maiwand, nephew of Ms. Achakzai)

References

External links
Notice of Achakzai's murder 
 Notice of Achakzai's murder 
CBC report on Sitara Achakzai
Report on Sitara Achakzai
 Globe and Mail report on Sitara Achakzai
 The Star report on Sitara Achakzai
The Huffington Post: "Sitara Achakzai, Martyr for Muslim Women"
about the live of Sitara Achakzai in Germany and Afghanistan 
"Let Women be Enlightened" by Helen Irving in the Sydney Morning Herald

1950s births
2009 deaths
Afghan feminists
Deaths by firearm in Afghanistan
German people of Afghan descent
Proponents of Islamic feminism
People from Kandahar
People killed by the Taliban
People murdered in Afghanistan
Violence against women in Afghanistan
Assassinated Afghan politicians
Naturalized citizens of Germany
21st-century Afghan women politicians
21st-century Afghan politicians